KSUU (91.1 FM) is a radio station broadcasting a variety format. Licensed to Cedar City, Utah, United States, the station is currently owned by the Southern Utah University.

History
The station went on the air as KCDR in 1965 on 88.1 MHz. The call letters and frequency changed to KGSU-FM on 90.1 MHz on September 30, 1980. In 1982, it changed to the current frequency of 91.1 MHz. On December 23, 1994, the station changed its call sign to the current KSUU. This was done so the call would reflect the name change of the school which owns the station.

References

External links

Radio stations established in 1980
SUU
Southern Utah University
Cedar City, Utah